Joanne S. Johnson (born 1977, Birmingham, née Garner) is a geologist and Antarctic scientist, who has worked for British Antarctic Survey (BAS) since 2002. She works in the palaeoenvironments, ice sheets and climate change team and is best known for her work on glacial retreat. The Johnson Mesa in James Ross Island, Antarctica is named in her honour.

Early life and education
Johnson decided to follow a science career after enjoying studying science at King Edward VI High School for Girls during her teenage years. In 1998, Johnson obtained a BSc degree in Geology (1st class) from Durham University (Hatfield College). She then went on to complete a PhD in 2002, supervised by at Clare College, Cambridge, with a thesis on Magmatism of the Vitim Volcanic Field, Baikal Rift Zone, Siberia. The research consisted of using geochemical characteristics of lavas to study the composition and thickness of the lithosphere in the Baikal Rift Zone of Siberia, and to improve understanding of the melting regime beneath the region during the Cenozoic.

Career and research
After her PhD, Johnson began work at British Antarctic Survey (BAS). The first project she worked on (2002–2005) was an analysis of the origin and implications of authigenic alteration minerals in volcaniclastic rocks from James Ross Island. In 2005–2009, she worked in the QWAD (Quaternary West Antarctic Deglaciation project), within the GRADES (Glacial Retreat in Antarctica and Deglaciation of the Earth System) programme at BAS, reconstructing Quaternary thinning history of Pine Island Glacier. Her work showed that Pine Island Glacier thinned as rapidly 8000 years ago as it is at the present day.

From 2015 to 2020, Johnson is working on a Natural Environment Research Council (NERC) funded project  "Reconstructing millennial-scale ice sheet change in the western Amundsen Sea Embayment, Antarctica, using high-precision exposure dating", with a team from BAS, Imperial College London, Durham University, Columbia University (USA) and Pennsylvania State University (USA). She is also working on other projects including 
 Exploring feedbacks between glaciation, volcanism and climate in Antarctica: studying carbon dioxide outgassing from the James Ross Island lavas using melt inclusions in olivines
 Determining Quaternary glacial history of the Lassiter Coast, Antarctica 
 Comminution dating boundary conditions: A study of (234U/238U) disequilibrium along the Antarctic Peninsula
 Antarctic Peninsula exhumation and landscape development investigated by low-temperature detrital thermochronometry

Some of her research has taken place in remote parts of the West Antarctic Ice Sheet.

Publications
Her publications include:
Collaborating On Glacial Research
Rapid thinning of Pine Island Glacier in the early Holocene
Zeolite compositions as proxies for eruptive palaeoenvironment
Volcanism in the Vitim Volcanic Field, Siberia: Geochemical Evidence for a Mantle Plume Beneath the Baikal Rift Zone

Awards and honours
Johnson was awarded the Laws Prize by BAS in 2008 and the Columbia University, Marie Tharp Fellowship for 2010–2011. The three-month fellowship allowed Johnson to collaborate with scientists at Lamont–Doherty Earth Observatory with the results published in the journal Science. 

In January 2007, due to the impact of Johnson's work (which also led to a completely novel proxy for recognising past ice sheets using alteration mineral chemistry), the UK Antarctic Place-Names Committee named a feature on James Ross Island, Antarctica after her. Johnson Mesa, James Ross Island, Antarctica (63° 49'40"S, 57° 55'22"W) is a large flat-topped volcanic mountain north of Abernethy Flats, between Crame Col and Bibby Point on Ulu Peninsula, James Ross Island.

Personal life
Johnson is married with two children (2008 and 2013): She has spoken about the challenges of doubling as a scientist and mother: "The hardest thing is being torn between your personal and professional ambitions…Wanting to go to conferences, but not wanting to leave your children. Having to leave work early or drop everything if you get a phone call that she's sick. You could be in the middle of a complicated thought process and you have to start again."

In August 2021, Johnson appeared on BBC1's Songs of Praise discussing her work and her Christian faith. She states that her expeditions refresh her faith and that how being in the Antarctic it is "the closest you can get to God".

References

British women scientists
British geologists
1977 births
People from Birmingham, West Midlands
Living people
Women Antarctic scientists
Alumni of the University of Cambridge
Alumni of Hatfield College, Durham
British women geologists
People educated at King Edward VI High School for Girls, Birmingham
Alumni of Clare College, Cambridge
British Antarctic scientists